Flamengo Esporte Clube de Arcoverde, commonly known as Flamengo de Arcoverde, is a Brazilian football club based in Arcoverde, Pernambuco state. They competed in the Série C once.

History
The club was founded on May 1, 1959. Flamengo de Arcoverde won the Campeonato Pernambucano Second Level in 1996. They competed in the Série C in 1997, when they were eliminated in the First Stage of the competition.

Achievements

 Campeonato Pernambucano Second Level:
 Winners (1): 1996

Stadium
Flamengo Esporte Clube de Arcoverde play their home games at Estádio Municipal Áureo Bradley. The stadium has a maximum capacity of 3,500 people.

References

Football clubs in Pernambuco
Association football clubs established in 1959
1959 establishments in Brazil